Cyril John Radcliffe, 1st Viscount Radcliffe,  (30 March 1899 – 1 April 1977) was a British lawyer and Law Lord best known for his role in the Partition of India. He served as the first chancellor of the University of Warwick from its foundation in 1965 to 1977.

Background, education and early career

Radcliffe was born in Llanychan, Denbighshire, Wales, the son of an army captain. His maternal grandfather was President of the Law Society between 1890 and 1891.

Radcliffe was educated at Haileybury College. He was conscripted in World War I but his poor eyesight limited the options for service so he was allocated to the Labour Corps. After the War, he attended New College, Oxford as a scholar, and took a first in literae humaniores in 1921. In 1922 he was elected to a prize fellowship at All Souls College, Oxford. He won the Eldon Law Scholarship in 1923.

He was called to the bar by the Inner Temple in 1924, and joined the chambers of Wilfred Greene, later the Master of the Rolls. He practised at the Chancery bar, and was appointed a King's Counsel in 1935.

During World War II, Radcliffe joined the Ministry of Information becoming its Director-General by 1941, where he worked closely with the Minister Brendan Bracken. In 1944 he was made a Knight Commander of the Order of the British Empire (KBE). He returned to the bar in 1945.

Indian Boundary Committees

Radcliffe, a man who had never been east of Paris, was given the chairmanship of the two boundary committees set up with the passing of the Indian Independence Act.  Radcliffe was given the task of drawing the borders for the new nations of Pakistan and India in a way that would leave as many Sikhs and Hindus in India and Muslims in Pakistan as possible. He was given only 5 weeks to complete the job. Radcliffe submitted his partition map on 9 August 1947, which split apart Punjab and Bengal almost in half. The new boundaries were formally announced on 17 August 1947 – three days after Pakistan's independence and two days after India became independent of the United Kingdom.

Radcliffe's efforts saw some 14 million people – roughly seven million from each side – flee across the border when they discovered the new boundaries left them in the "wrong" country. In the violence that ensued after independence, estimates of loss of life accompanying or preceding the partition vary between several hundred thousand and two million, and millions more were injured. After seeing the mayhem occurring on both sides of the boundary, Radcliffe refused his salary of 40,000 rupees (then 3,000 pounds). He was made a Knight Grand Cross of the Order of the British Empire in 1948. 

Speaking of his experience as the chairman of boundary committees, he later said-"I had no alternative, the time at my disposal was so short that I could not do a better job. Given the same period I would do the same thing. However, if I had two to three years, I might have improved on what I did."The poet W. H. Auden referred to Radcliffe's role in the partition of India and Pakistan in his 1966 poem "Partition".

Later career
In 1949, Radcliffe was made a Lord of Appeal in Ordinary, sworn of the Privy Council, and created a life peer as Baron Radcliffe, of Werneth in the County of Lancaster. Unusually, he had not previously been a judge. In the 1940s and 1950s he chaired a string of public enquiries in addition to his legal duties and continued to hold numerous trusteeships, governorships and chairmanships right up until his death. He chaired the Committee of Enquiry into the Future of the British Film Institute (1948), whose recommendations led to the modernisation of the BFI in the post-war period. 

From 1957 he was chairman of the Radcliffe Committee, called to enquire into the working of the monetary and credit system. The committee published a report known as the Radcliffe report which suggested reforms on how monetary policy is run. He was also a frequent public speaker and wrote numerous books: he gave the BBC Reith Lecture in 1951 – a series of seven broadcasts titled Power and the State which examined the features of democratic society, and considered the problematic notions of power and authority. He also presented the Oxford University Romanes Lecture in 1963 on Mountstuart Elphinstone. 

In 1962 he was made a hereditary peer as Viscount Radcliffe, of Hampton Lucy in the County of Warwick.

Personal life

Lord Radcliffe married Antonia Mary Roby, daughter of Godfrey Benson, 1st Baron Charnwood and former wife of John Tennant, in 1939. He died in April 1977, aged 78. He had no issue and the viscountcy of Radcliffe became extinct on his death.

In 2006, two sets of Chancery barristers' chambers in Lincoln's Inn merged and adopted the name "Radcliffe Chambers".

Arms

See also 
Radcliffe Line
Partition of India

Notes

References

Further reading
 Chester, Lucy P.  Borders and Conflict in South Asia: The Radcliffe Boundary Commission and the Partition of Punjab.  Manchester UP, 2009.

1899 births
1977 deaths
British people of the Cyprus Emergency
British King's Counsel
Chancellors of the University of Warwick
English Anglicans
20th-century English judges
Fellows of All Souls College, Oxford
Knights Grand Cross of the Order of the British Empire
Law lords
Members of the Judicial Committee of the Privy Council
Members of the Privy Council of the United Kingdom
Fellows of the British Academy
Alumni of New College, Oxford
People educated at Haileybury and Imperial Service College
Life peers created by George VI
Viscounts created by Elizabeth II
British Army personnel of World War I
Royal Pioneer Corps soldiers